Sawang may refer to:

 Sawang, Bhutan
 Sawang Boriboon, humanitarian rescue Thai based NGO operating within Pattaya
 Sawang Barangay of Romblon, Romblon